The Menoscinae are a subfamily of planthoppers in the family Lophopidae erected by Leopold Melichar in 1915.  Most genera are recorded from SE Asia through to Australia, but the single genus in tribe Carrioniini is Neotropical.

Tribes and Genera
Fulgoromorpha Lists on the Web includes:

Acarnini
Auth.: Baker, 1925 (New Guinea, Australia)
 Acarna Stål, 1863
 Jugoda Melichar, 1915
 Kasserota Distant, 1906
 Maana Soulier-Perkins, 1998
 Magia Distant, 1907
 Megacarna Baker, 1925
 Meloenopia Metcalf, 1952
 Onycta Fennah, 1955
 Zophiuma Fennah, 1955

Carrioniini
Auth.: Emeljanov, 2013 (Central & South America: monotypic)
 Carrionia Muir, 1931

Menoscini
Auth.: Melichar, 1915 (Indochina, Malesia)
 Aluma Distant, 1909
 Apia Distant, 1909
 Bisma Distant, 1906
 Epiptyxis Gerstaecker, 1895
 Lapithasa Melichar, 1914
 Menosca Stål, 1870
 Pseudocorethrura Melichar, 1915
 Pseudotyxis Soulier-Perkins, 1998
 Zeleja Melichar, 1915

Virgiliini
Auth.: Emeljanov, 2013 (New Guinea, Philippines)
 Buxtoniella Muir, 1927
 Clonaspe Fennah, 1955
 Makota Distant, 1909
 Painella Muir, 1931
 Venisiella Stroinski & Soulier-Perkins, 2015
 Virgilia Stål, 1870

References

External Links

Hemiptera subfamilies
Lophopidae
Hemiptera of Asia
Hemiptera of Australia